You Can't Win 'Em All is a 1970 British-American war film, written by Leo Gordon (also an actor who appears in the film) and directed by Peter Collinson. It stars Tony Curtis, Charles Bronson and Michèle Mercier.

Plot
The setting is the time of the Greco-Turkish War (1919–1922), and the end of the Ottoman Empire. Two American soldiers of fortune – Adam (Curtis) and Josh (Bronson) – team up in 1922 Turkey with separate missions.  Josh is interested in profiting from the turmoil prevailing as the Ottoman Empire collapses.  Adam, the surviving heir to a shipping company, hopes to reclaim a ship seized by the Germans during World War I and interned in a Turkish Port.  Before they can achieve their goals, they are captured by the forces of Osman Bey, an Ottoman governor.  Osman Bey is impressed by the Americans' firepower – which includes Thompson submachine guns – and enlists them in a mission to escort his daughters, seemingly to Mecca, but really to Cairo.  Because of the war, Turkish ports are blockaded by the British.  Knowing that an American ship is not subject to the blockade, Adam suggests using the one held by the Turks, once they have returned it to him.

With Osman Bey's consent, the group sets off for the coast with Osman Bey's daughters, and also their guardian, the beautiful and formidable Aila.  Along the way, they must contend with the dangers of the terrain, the war, the machinations of Osman Bey's opportunistic Colonel and also each other's greed.  They also begin to realize that the Bey wasn't open with them about the real object of their mission, to safeguard a priceless treasure from the empire's enemies.

Cast 

Uncredited voice actors:
David de Keyser
Roger Delgado
Robert Rietty

Production
The film was originally known as Dubious Patriots.

"The country, the people, were fabulous", said Tony Curtis shortly after filming ended. "The thing that did us in was the very shoddy British production set up. They promised certain things on location and didn't provide them. There were inadequate sanitary conditions: people got sick. The director, Peter Collinson? I have no comment about Mr Collinson. Some day I'll tell you about him."

Aircraft sequences were flown and coordinated by Charles Boddington and Lewis Benjamin. The aircraft were owned by ex-RCAF pilot Lynn Garrison who shipped several of his S.E.5 replicas from Ireland to Turkey for the production. They were previously featured in The Blue Max and Darling Lili and would go on to star in Von Richthofen and Brown, Zeppelin, The Great Waldo Pepper, and numerous TV commercials.

See also
Vera Cruz, a 1954 film with a similar plot set in the Mexican Revolution.

Bibliography

 Benjamin, Lewis. "Turkish Delight!". Aeroplane Monthly. October 2008, Vol. 36, Issue 426, pp. 32–37.

References

External links

 
You Can't Win 'Em All at the TCM Movie Database

British war films
1970 films
1970s adventure films
1970s English-language films
British aviation films
British buddy films
Films set in 1922
Turkish War of Independence films
Columbia Pictures films
Films set in Turkey
Films shot in Turkey
Rail transport films
Films produced by Gene Corman
Films about mercenaries
American action adventure films
American action comedy films
Films set in Istanbul
Films shot in Istanbul
Films set in İzmir
Films shot in İzmir
Films directed by Peter Collinson
1970s American films
1970s British films